Lake Discovery is a lake,  long, situated at the north end of Hurricane Ridge on the west margin of Discovery Glacier, Scott Coast, Victoria Land. It was named by the Advisory Committee on Antarctic Names (1999) in association with Discovery Glacier, a partial source for the lake, and Mount Discovery, the dominant feature in the vicinity.

References 

Lakes of Victoria Land
Scott Coast